Bellabeat is a Silicon Valley data-centered wellness femtech subsidiary company of Five River Groups Inc. founded by Urška Sršen, Lovepreet Singh and Sandro Mur in 2014. It is best known for its Leaf smart jewelry wearable line that is created only for women and tracks sleep, steps, menstrual cycle, mindfulness, and activity. Throughout the years, Bellabeat built the go-to wellness brand for women with a compelling ecosystem of solutions and services focused on women’s health. The company has offices in San Francisco, Zagreb, Hong Kong, and London.

History 
Bellabeat was founded in 2014 by Croatian mathematician Sandro Mur and Slovenian sculptor Urška Sršen later joined by Indian cybersecurity specialist Lovepreet Singh in 2016. The same year, they participated in the Y Combinator program and finished top of the class (W14). After graduating from Y Combinator they raised a $4.5M seed round.

Products

Smart Jewelry 
The company’s main products are wearables available in two models: Leaf and Ivy.

Bellabeat Leaf 

A year after its Y Combinator debut, in 2015, Bellabeat launched its first edition wearable tracker called Leaf Nature, characterized by its nature-inspired design and versatility of wear. It was the first wearable for women that tracks activity, sleep, and stress resistance. The same year, the company added period and pregnancy tracking to its accompanying app.

In 2016 the company launched Leaf Urban, the updated version of the previous Leaf tracker that featured a more modern, water-resistant design, and updated the corresponding Bellabeat app with additional mindfulness guidance. Leaf collection was later expanded to include Leaf Chakra in 2018 and Leaf Crystal, created in partnership with Swarovski crystals in 2019.

Bellabeat Ivy 
In 2021, Bellabeat launched Ivy, a new and upgraded health & wellness tracker. After selling 20,000 preorders in the first hour of its announcement in late 2020, Bellabeat has sold over 50,000 preorders of its Ivy by January 2021. Ivy is a smart-wearable product made specifically for women, just like its predecessor. It has improved sensors, and monitoring capabilities, and tracks data to support its female wearers' overall well-being, productivity, and reproductive health. It monitors women's biometric data: respiratory rate, resting heart rate, heart rate variability (HRV), and cardiac coherence, as well as lifestyle data in the form of steps, activity, mindfulness, light, deep, and REM sleep, as well as sleep timing and quality to give a comprehensive picture of their performance, health, recovery, and wellbeing. It has a battery life of up to 20 days.

Hydration trackers

Spring 
Bellabeat launched its smart water bottle Spring in 2016, giving its users an opportunity to automatically track their water intake within the Bellabeat app. Spring runs on Bellabeat proprietary tracking technology developed to work for women’s bodies. Through wireless syncing and with a secure data backup, Spring calculates exactly how much water the user needs based on their lifestyle and health (eg. pregnancy, breastfeeding) and reminds them to drink throughout the day. It is made of glass, BPA-free Tritan™, and high-quality rubber; and features a replaceable-coin cell battery with a battery life of up to 6 months.

B.YOU Wellness Line 
In 2021 Bellabeat expanded its catalog with B.YOU line of wellness accessories. B.YOU line consists of menstrual cups, a yoga mat, and workout bands.

Mobile apps

Bellabeat App 
All Bellabeat trackers sync to the Bellabeat app. Released in 2014 for its first wearable tracker, Leaf, the Bellabeat app featured activity, sleep, cycle, hydration, and mindfulness tracking. In 2016 the mindfulness section was expanded with guided meditations for better sleep, focus, and easing of menstrual pain, in addition to breathing exercises. In 2017 Bellabeat launched Airi: a chat-based personal wellness coach (predecessor of Bellabeat Coach) as a subscription-based feature within the Bellabeat app.

In 2021 Bellabeat expanded the cycle-tracking section in the app to give detailed tips on cycle phases and educate users on them.

In 2019, Bellabeat launched Bellabeat+ Membership: a subscription service that provides women with specialized content in all wellness segments. With the subscription (that can be used with and without the device), users receive personalized daily plans and coaching, aligned with their menstrual cycle and goals.

Within the Bellabeat app, access to all tracking features is free with the purchase of a device.

Period Diary 
In 2018, Bellabeat expanded its catalog with the Period Diary app which became a part of the Bellabeat ecosystem of apps. Period Diary app is a menstrual cycle tracking app in which women can track their menstrual cycle length, period duration, moods, symptoms, temperature, and input notes.

Period Diary is available for both iOS and Android.

Privacy and Security 
In the aftermath of Roe v. Wade, Bellabeat upgraded its standard end-to-end encryption with an additional layer of protection called Private Key Encryption (AES-256) Security Feature. PKE works by encrypting the user’s data fully for everyone except themselves and is decrypted with a personal key that only the user has. For users that opt-in for using PKE, everyone except the user doesn’t have access to the decrypted data.

Awards 

 2015: Awarded Best Startup by The Europas
 2020: Leaf Urban named Best Smart Jewelry Tracker of 2020 by Business Insider
 2020: Received HAMAG Award for International Research and Cooperation
 2021: Received Big SEE award for Ivy design
 2022: Bellabeat Ivy selected as one of TIME’s 2022 Best Inventions
 2023: Y Combinator Top Companies 2023

Partnerships & Endorsements 
Bellabeat partners with Swarovski in 2018 to launch Bellabeat Leaf Crystal, created with Swarovski crystals.

In 2021, Bellabeat partners with Poosh by Kourtney Kardashian for the Poosh Your Wellness Festival, where the company held a solo panel with the topic "Living by Your Cycle With Bellabeat" lead by Bellabeat's co-founder Urška Sršen and Shayna Taylor, a holistic nutritionist.

Bellabeat has been endorsed by athletes and celebrities such as Olivia Culpo, Tammin Sursok, Chiara Ferragni, Amanda Seyfried, Mila Kunis, and Chari Hawkins.

References

External links
Official website

American companies established in 2013
Jewelry companies of the United States
Companies based in San Francisco